The 1989–90 Kansas Jayhawks men's basketball team represented the University of Kansas in the 1989–90 NCAA Division I men's basketball season, which was the Jayhawks' 92nd basketball season. The head coach was Roy Williams, who served his 2nd year at KU. The team played its home games in Allen Fieldhouse in Lawrence, Kansas. The team set an NCAA record for largest unranked to ranked jump. Following the preseason NIT, where the Jayhawks defeated the 2nd, 1st, and 25th ranked teams in the nation, the Jayhawks jumped to the 4th ranked team in the nation. They remained in the top two for the remainder of the regular season. The season also marked the beginning of an NCAA-record 31 consecutive NCAA tournament appearances that as of the 2022 tournament (there was no tournament in 2020 due to the COVID-19 pandemic) is still active. The Jayhawks 150–95 victory over Kentucky on December 9, remains the most points scored in a game in Kansas basketball history and the worst defeat in Kentucky's history.

Roster

Big Eight Conference standings

Schedule 

|-

|-

|-
!colspan=9| Big Eight Tournament

|-
!colspan=9| NCAA tournament

Rankings 

*There was no coaches poll in week 1.

See also 
 1990 NCAA Division I men's basketball tournament

References 

Kansas Jayhawks men's basketball seasons
Kansas
Kansas
Kansas Jay
Jay